The state anthem of the Kazakh Soviet Socialist Republic was the national anthem of Kazakhstan when it was a republic of the Soviet Union and known as the Kazakh SSR.

Background
The music was composed by Mukan Tölebaev, Russian composer Yevgeny Brusilovsky and Tatar composer Latıf Hamıdı, with lyrics written by Kazakh authors Äbdilda Täjibaev, Qaiym Muhamedhanov and Ğabıt Müsirepov. In 1992, new lyrics were adopted with the same melody as the anthem of independent Kazakhstan, until 7 January 2006.

From 1991 to 1997, it was one of the five remaining republics that appreciated its old anthem, then from 1997 to 2000, it became one of four (when Turkmenistan changed its anthem). From 2000 to 2006, it is one of the five remaining again (when Russia changed its anthem). It was also the only regional anthem in which the term "communism" was not mentioned in the entire lyrics.

Lyrics
Original words which were removed during the post-Stalinist era are indicated with parenthesis.

Notes

References

Sources
Қазақ совет энциклопедиясы (the Kazakh Soviet Encyclopedia) (1972–1978)

External links
 Instrumental recording in MP3 format (Full version)
 Instrumental recording in MP3 format (Short version)
MIDI file
Vocal recording in MP3 format
Lyrics - nationalanthems.info
Original version (1946-1953)

Kazakh SSR
Kazakhstani music
National symbols of Kazakhstan
Kazakh Soviet Socialist Republic
Year of song missing